Philadelphia Episcopal Cathedral, located at 38th and Ludlow Streets in West Philadelphia, is the cathedral church of the Episcopal Diocese of Pennsylvania.

Formerly known as the Protestant Episcopal Church of the Saviour, it was built in 1855, renovated in 1898, and rebuilt in the year 1906, after an April 16, 1902 fire. In 1992 it became the seat of the Episcopal Diocese of Pennsylvania.

The building was added to the National Register of Historic Places in 1979.

Recent history
A highly-controversial renovation of the interior was undertaken, 2000–2002, under then-cathedral dean Richard Giles, author of Re-Pitching the Tent: Re-Ordering the Church Building for Worship and Mission. The pews, altar, and other church furniture were removed and sold. Chairs and modern lighting fixtures replaced the traditional fixtures. The stone walls were stuccoed over and whitewashed. The baptismal font was joined by an immersion pool for adults. These actions divided the congregation and were severely criticized in the press.

In 2012, facing a $3.5 million bill to renovate its bell tower, current cathedral dean Judith Sullivan petitioned the Philadelphia Historical Commission for permission to demolish its parish house and rectory, both NRHP-certified buildings. They would be replaced with a 25-story apartment building wedged between the cathedral and Chestnut Street. The demolition was approved.

See also
List of the Episcopal cathedrals of the United States
List of cathedrals in the United States

References

External links

 Cathedral website

Churches on the National Register of Historic Places in Pennsylvania
Churches completed in 1855
19th-century Episcopal church buildings
Episcopal churches in Pennsylvania
Churches in Philadelphia
Tourist attractions in Philadelphia
University City, Philadelphia
Properties of religious function on the National Register of Historic Places in Philadelphia
Episcopal cathedrals in Pennsylvania
Cathedrals in Philadelphia